Amara aurichalcea is a species of beetle of the genus Amara in the family Carabidae.

aurata
Beetles described in 1824